Potamalpheops is a genus of shrimp in the family Alpheidae. It was originally erected by Powell in 1979 to house species from Africa. Later, Horton H. Hobbs, Jr. realised that the troglobitic shrimp he had described in 1973 from Oaxaca, Mexico as Alpheopsis stygicola, also belonged to the genus, and in 1991, A. J. Bruce described a new species from Australia, further expanding the genus' geographical range. It is now thought to represent a relict taxon from the Tethys Sea.

The following species are currently accepted as valid:

Potamalpheops darwiniensis Bruce, 1993
Potamalpheops galle Anker, 2005
Potamalpheops hanleyi Bruce, 1991
Potamalpheops haugi (Coutière, 1906)
Potamalpheops johnsoni Anker, 2003
Potamalpheops miyai Yeo & Ng, 1997
Potamalpheops monodi Sollaud, 1932)
Potamalpheops palawensis Y. Cai & Anker, 2004
Potamalpheops pininsulae Bruce & Iliffe, 1992
Potamalpheops pylorus Powell, 1979
Potamalpheops tigger Yeo & Ng, 1997

References

Alpheidae
Decapod genera